The 1976 Dayton Pro Tennis Classic, was a men's tennis tournament played on indoor carpet courts at the Dayton Convention Center in Dayton, Ohio, in the United States that was part of the 1976 USLTA Indoor Circuit. It was the third edition of the event and was held from February 4 through February 8, 1976. First-seeded Jaime Fillol won the singles title and earned $10,000 first-prize money.

Finals

Singles
 Jaime Fillol defeated  Andrew Pattison 6–4, 6–7, 6–4
 It was Fillol's 1st singles title of the year and the 7th of his career.

Doubles
 Ray Ruffels /  Sherwood Stewart defeated  Jaime Fillol /  Charlie Pasarall 6–2, 3–6, 7–5

References

Dayton Pro Tennis Classic
Dayton Pro Tennis Classic
Dayton Pro Tennis Classic